Crkvina is a Serbo-Croatian placename that may refer to:

Crkvina (island), uninhabited Croatian island in the Adriatic
Crkvina, Bosanski Šamac, village in the Bosanski Šamac municipality in Bosnia and Herzegovina
Crkvina (Kruševac), village in the Kruševac municipality in Serbia

See also
Cerkovinë, Albania
Crkvine (disambiguation)

Serbo-Croatian toponyms